Rear Admiral Samantha Wimalathunga RWP, USP, MSc(DS)Mgt, MA(SSS) is the former Naval officer who served as Director of Sri Lanka Coast Guard.

Wimalathunga undertook his education at Elapitiwela Kanishta Vidyalaya, Gampaha and Nalanda College, Colombo, before joining the Sri Lanka Navy as a Cadet Officer in 1984. Wimalathunga is a Master of Science graduate of General Sir John Kotelawala Defence University in Defence Studies, Master of Arts graduate of National Defense University Washington D.C., USA, Master of Science graduate of National Defence University, Pakistan in National Security and War.

Wimalathunga was the Deputy Area Commander of the North Western and the Northern Naval Areas. He has also held the position of Director Logistics Management Cell at the Naval Headquarters.

In July 2015 Wimalathunga was appointed the Director General of the Sri Lanka Coast Guard.

General references 

 Katchativu Church festival - a meeting point for devotees of India and Sri Lanka , concluded peacefully
 Nalanda College Alumni (Sri Lanka Navy)

Sri Lankan Buddhists
Alumni of Nalanda College, Colombo
Sri Lankan rear admirals
Sinhalese military personnel
Naval and Maritime Academy graduates
Living people
Year of birth missing (living people)